Luyi primarily refers to Luyi County (鹿邑县), of Zhoukou, Henan, China:

Luyi may also refer to:

4776 Luyi, main-belt asteroid discovered in 1975, named after the county
Luyi, Zhenping County, Henan (卢医镇), town in Zhenping County, Henan, China